Acanthodoris pilosa, the hairy spiny doris, is a species of sea slug, a dorid nudibranch, a shell-less marine gastropod mollusc in the family Onchidorididae. It is found in shallow water in the northeastern Atlantic Ocean, its range extending from Norway to France, and also both on the eastern coast of Canada and the United States, and the Pacific coast from the Aleutian Islands to Morro Bay, California.

Description
It gives the impression of being fluffy because the body is covered with long, fleshy pointed papillae. At the head end are two rhinophores, much larger than the papillae, which house the sensory organs; these typically are bent towards the rear of the animal. At the posterior end there is a distinctive ring of up to nine gills. This sea slug has a uniform colour which may be anything from whitish to pale purplish-brown to darker brown or charcoal grey. Juveniles are often speckled.

Distribution
This species was first described from Norway. It has been reported from the North Atlantic Ocean on both the American and European coasts, and from the Pacific Northwest. Specimens from Cobscook Bay, Washington County, Maine and Murles Point, County Donegal, Ireland have been sequenced for the 16S ribosomal RNA, Histone H3 and CO1 genes.

Reports of this species from Japan must be considered doubtful in the light of recent molecular phylogeny results which show that at least some of the animals from the North Pacific are Acanthodoris atrogriseata.

Ecology
This nudibranch is found on rocks and other hard substrates and feeds on encrusting bryozoans.

References

External links

Onchidorididae
Gastropods described in 1789